is a city located in Okayama Prefecture, Japan. , the city had an estimated population of 32,019 in 15,467 households and a population density of 120 persons per km².

Geography
Bizen is located in southeastern  Okayama Prefecture. It faces the Seto Inland Sea to the south, and the coastline is intricate and forms part of the Setonaikai National Park. Katakami Bay extends into the center of the city. The Hinase area in the southeastern part of the country is dotted with islands. Overall, there are few flat areas and hilly areas, and about 80% of the city is forested. The Yoshinaga district in the northeastern part is a plateau area with an altitude of 300 to 500 meters. The southwestern edge of the city is the easternmost edge of the Okayama Plain, and the plain is slightly open, and the Yoshii River flows from the north to the south at the westernmost edge.

Adjoining municipalities
Okayama Prefecture
Okayama
Setouchi
Akaiwa
Mimasaka
Wake
Hyōgo Prefecture
Ako
Kamigōri
Sayō

Climate
Bizen has a humid subtropical climate (Köppen climate classification Cfa) with very warm summers and cool winters.  The average annual temperature in Bizen is 15.9 °C. The average annual rainfall is 1460 mm with September as the wettest month. The temperatures are highest on average in January, at around 27.1 °C, and lowest in January, at around 5.5 °C.

Demographics
Per Japanese census data, the population of Bizen has been declining for then past 60 years.

History 
The Bizen area is part of ancient Bizen Province and has been famous for its Bizen ware pottery since the Kamakura period. During the Edo Period, it was part of the holdings of Okayama Domain. Following the Meiji restoration, the village of Imbe was established within Wake District, Okayama with the creation of the modern municipalities system on April 1, 1889. It was raised to town status on April 1, 1912. On April 1, 1951, Imbe merged with the town of Kakakami to form the town of Bizen. On April 1, 1971, Bizen was raised to city status. On March 22, 2005, the towns of Hinase and Yoshinaga (both from Wake District) were merged into Bizen. ².

Government
Bizen has a mayor-council form of government with a directly elected mayor and a unicameral city council of 16 members. Bizen, collectively with the town of Wake, contributes two members to the Okayama Prefectural Assembly. In terms of national politics, the city is part of the Okayama 1st district of the lower house of the Diet of Japan.

Economy
Bizen has long been associated with the pottery industry, and Bizen ware workshops and pottery shops are concentrated in the Imbe district. The square brick chimneys that can be seen in large numbers in the city are from Bizen ware kilns. However, the  core industry of the city is refractory bricks, which are made in the Mitsuishi area, as well as activated carbon. Commercial fishing is also important in coastal areas, especially the Hirase area which is noted for using aquaculture for oyster production.

Education
Bizen has ten public elementary schools,  five public junior high schools and one public high school operated by the city government, and one public high school operated by the Okayama prefectural Board of Education. The prefecture also operates one special education school for the disabled.

Transportation

Railway 
 JR West (JR West) - San'yō Main Line
  - 
 JR West (JR West) - Akō Line
  -  -  -  -  -

Highways 
  San'yō Expressway

Sister city relations
 - Clare and Gilbert Valleys Council, South Australia, Australia since January 1990

Local attractions
former Shizutani School, a Special National Historic Site 
Bizen pottery kiln ruins, National Historic Site
Tsuruyama Maruyama Kofun, National Historic Site
 Hakuchō Masamune's birthplace, which is now a museum.
Kōken-ji

Notable people from Bizen
Masamune Atsuo, researcher of Japanese literature and a poet
Genkei Masamune, botanist
Hakuchō Masamune, critic, novelist, and dramatist
Risa Shigetomo, long-distance runner
Kaneshige Toyo, potter

References

External links

 Bizen City official website 
 Bizen City official website

Cities in Okayama Prefecture
Bizen, Okayama
Populated coastal places in Japan